The women's 60 metres hurdles event  at the 1975 European Athletics Indoor Championships was held on 8 March in Katowice.

Medalists

Results

Heats
First 2 from each heat (Q) and the next 4 fastest (q) qualified for the final.

Final

References

60 metres hurdles at the European Athletics Indoor Championships
60